Wyoming Highway 216 (WYO 216), Albin Road, is a  state highway in the northeastern part of Laramie County,Wyoming, United States, that connects U.S. Route 85 (US 85), south-southwest of Meriden with County Road 164 (CR 164) at the Nebraska state line (east of Albin).

Route description
WYO 216 travels east intersecting Wyoming Highway 213 (Burns North Road) after just . At , WYO 216 intersects the northern terminus of WYO 215. WYO 216 then continues east to CR 164 (State Line Road), located on the Nebraska–Wyoming state line, where it terminates.

History

The Wyoming Highway 216 designation was originally commissioned in 1926 in Weston and Crook counties. US 16 and [[Wyoming Highway 116
]] were designated the same year. WYO 216 began as a state route, but was quickly added to the U.S. route system as US 216. However, in 1936, US 216 became part of the US 16 mainline, and the US 216 designation was deleted.

Major intersections

See also

 List of state highways in Wyoming

References

 Official 2003 State Highway Map of Wyoming

External links

 WYO 216 - NE State Line to WYO 215
 WYO 216 - WYO 215 to WYO 213
 WYO 216 - WYO 213 to US 85

Transportation in Laramie County, Wyoming
216